St Andrew's Church, Norwich is a Grade I listed medieval building in Norwich.

History
Saint Andrew's is a fine example of a hall church. In late Perpendicular Gothic style with a timber roof of tie beam construction, it is the second largest church in Norwich, and one of the last medieval churches to be built in the city. The main body of the church dates from 1499 to 1518. The tower dates from 1498, the south porch from c.1469 and the north porch from c. 1474.

After the Reformation St Andrew's became a preaching house for the new 'Protestant' religion. In August 1603 John Robinson (1576 - 1625) became associate pastor of St. Andrew's Church. Norwich at this time, had strong links with Holland and Flanders. It was the home to a considerable number of foreign workers and refugees and its most influential political leaders and merchants were Puritans. Robinson was one of the founders of the Congregational church and later became pastor to the Pilgrim Fathers before their emigration to the New World.

Main dates 

1386     Bequests made to a church on this site                   
1478     West tower under construction
c.1496   Work on West tower completed
1506     Work completed on the nave and chancel, replacing the previous structure
1557     Elizabeth Cooper, wife of a pewterer, burned as a heretic. Foxe's Book of Martyrs
1607     Churchwardens excommunicated for installing special seating for local dignitaries
1637     Font cover produced
1867     Major restoration work undertaken including new pews, pulpit and stone screen
1878     Font replaced
1905     Organ case installed

Memorials
There are monuments to:

Robert Suckling (d. 1589)
Francis Rugge (d. 1607)
Robert Garsett (d. 1613)
Sir John Suckling (d. 1627)
Dr. Thomas Crowe (d. 1751) by Robert Page
John Custance (d. 1752) by Thomas Rawlins
Hambleton Custance (d. 1757) by Thomas Rawlins
Richard Dennison (d. 1768) by Thomas Rawlins

Also interred at the church are silversmith Arthur Haselwood II and his wife, Elizabeth, herself also a silversmith.

Organ

The first organ in the church was installed in 1808. This was G.P. England and had previously been in the Assembly House, then called Chapel Field House. The current organ was installed in 1905 and is by Norman and Beard. The successor firm of Hill, Norman & Beard added pipes and swell sub-octave coupler in 1919 and rebuilt it in 1980. The case was also installed in 1905, although it is not the work of Norman & Beard. A specification of the organ can be found on the National Pipe Organ Register.

References

Saint Andrew
15th-century church buildings in England
Grade I listed churches in Norfolk